HiteJinro Co., Ltd. is a South Korean multinational drink, brewing and distiller company, founded in 1924. It is the world's leading producer of soju, accounting for more than half of that beverage's domestic sales. It also manufactures a variety of other alcoholic beverages including red wine and whiskey. Distilleries are located in Icheon, Cheongwon, and Masan, with the Masan plant geared toward exports. In addition, Jinro produces the Soksu brand of bottled water at a factory in Cheongwon. In 2006, the company was acquired by Hite, a popular beverage company whose main product is beer.

Jinro soju is known by the brand name Chamisul, which is the world's most popular liquor. Part of their marketing strategy is to use temperature sensitive paper on their bottle label. A tab in the shape of an Asiatic Toad (the company's mascot) is white when the bottle is warm and becomes blue when the bottle is cold, indicating that the soju is ready to drink.

Jinro has been named the top-selling spirit in the world in the Millionaires' Club 2016, after selling 73.8m 9-litre in the year 2015.

Products

Beer
Terra
Hite (Hite EXTRA COLD)
Max
Dry Finish D
Stout
Exfeel S
Filite
Queen's Ale – Blonde Type
Queen's Ale – Extra Bitter Type

Soju

Jinro is the largest manufacturer of soju accounting for half of all white spirits sold in South Korea. Soju accounts for 97% of the category. Global sales in 2013 were 750 million bottles; the second-largest spirits brand, Smirnoff, sold less than half that number. The most popular variety of soju is currently Chamisul (참이슬 - literally meaning "real dew"), a quadruple-filtered soju produced by Jinro. Other brands include:
Chamisul Classic
Chamisul Nature
IlpumJinro
JINRO GOLD
Chamisul Damgeumjoo
chamisul fresh
jinro 24
chamisul grapefruit
chamisul green grape
chamisul plum
jinro tok-tok sparkling soju peach
jinro tok-tok sparkling soju pineapple

Whiskey
Kingdom
Cutty Sark

Wine
HiteJinro wine

Subsidiary brands
Seoksu natural mineral water
Puriss

Success of Chamisul & Chamisul Fresh

Jinro launched Chamisul in South Korea on October 19, 1998. Their goal with the new brand was to break the stereotype that soju had to be 25% ABV to be palatable. The success of the brand changed the image of soju from a strong hearty spirit to a "soft and clean" one. The name Chamisul has been commonly associated with soju ever since and its introduction marked an historic breakthrough in the soju market, in terms of its quality, brand power, and sales volume. Chamisul was initially launched as a 23% ABV product when it was released. It has subsequently been revised to 20.1% ABV, while its sister sub-branding "Chamisul Fresh" is sold at 17.2% ABV. These two brands are currently leading the domestic soju market.

The brand has gained huge popularity by using bamboo charcoal filtration method since its launch. The recipe has also been renewed seven times since.

Chamisul has become a common placeword for soju in South Korea. The brand has been holding a 50% (or more) share of the domestic market since two years after its initial release.

Impact on Korean drinking culture
Hitejinro’s product line includes six beers, most notably the Hite label; seven soju lines, including the Korean favorite, Chamisul; two whiskey variations; and one wine. Together, this has garnered them a sizeable market share. Hite Brewery Co., Ltd. is the leading player in the Korean alcoholic drinks market, generating a 50.2% share.

Jinro's brand of soju is the biggest-selling spirit in the world, according to a survey by the UK-based Drinks International magazine, easily outselling vodka and whisky brands last year.

Average adult annual consumption of spirits in South Korea is 9.57 liters, the world’s highest, according to 2005 data from the World Health Organization published last year. The Korean landscape of drinking has resulted in numerous street brawls, increased family violence and other crimes involving drinking. This prevalent problem is further exacerbated due to very minimal government punishment when a crime is committed with alcohol.

Due to these occurrences, Hite-Jinro has begun putting warning labels on bottles of Chamisul and Beer products with messages reading: "No more drunken violence! Let's improve wrong drinking culture!"

"We felt tremendously responsible for social problems caused by drinking... we will help with efforts to change our drinking culture to a more positive one," said a sales manager at Hite-Jinro, quoted in Chosun Ilbo newspaper.

Expansion outside Korea
Soju sales are soaring and foreign companies are considering buying into one of the few Korean industries to relish the economic crisis. But outsiders face tough, patriotic competition.

With HiteJinro's most notable drink, Soju, it has quickly gained momentum and popularity as a vodka substitute. The spirit, which is distilled from rice, barley, and koji, has become a popular import; though, with the company operating in Russia, the US, South Korea, China and Japan, the Korean giant has begun setting its sights on India with a new bottling deal.

See also
Economy of South Korea

References

Notes

External links
 

Beer in South Korea
Food and drink companies established in 1924
1924 establishments in Korea
Manufacturing companies based in Seoul
South Korean brands